Denice Marie Duff (née Burker; born July 1, 1965 in New York City) is an American actress, director, and photographer, who is best known for her roles as Michelle Morgan in Full Moon Features' Subspecies series and as Amanda Browning in the long-running soap opera series The Young and the Restless.

Career
Denice was discovered by manager Jay Bernstein during a Hollywood Talent Search contest. She worked as an office intern in the contest office and the judges convinced her to audition. She was the only actress of 2000 who auditioned that was picked by Mr. Bernstein for representation.

Brought to the William Morris Agency, her first guest-starring role was on Northern Exposure. Other television roles were on Silk Stalkings, Reasonable Doubts, Matlock, Danger Theatre, The Young and The Restless, General Hospital, and Dream On.

Denice's television movies of the week include Double Jeopardy co-starring Bruce Boxleitner and Rachel Ward, and in Robin Cook's Invasion with Rebecca Gayheart and Luke Perry. She also starred in the movie Vampire Resurrection (2001).

Denice has performed on many nationally televised commercials such as the Fruit of the Loom campaign where she was the girl bopping about her bedroom trying to figure out what to wear and then finally flopping on a chair in nothing but her Fruit of the Loom underwear.

Denice has worked in a variety of films and has starred in such low-budget films as Bloodfist V: Human Target, Hell Comes to Frogtown II and Phoenix. She stars in Full Moon Entertainment's Subspecies series, in parts II, III, and IV.

Denice converted her garage into a photography studio and decided to go professional after test-shooting two friends. She has since photographed hundreds of artists, actors and musicians. Denice is a Scientologist. In 2015 Duff played the mid wife character Wendy on a few episodes of the long running soap opera Days of Our Lives.

Personal life
She is married to Michael Duff, who is a singer and a guitarist in his band Chalk FarM. They have one daughter, Paris Helena Duff, who is a fashion photographer and model.

Filmography
Meet Me at the Dog Bar - 1990
The Second Greatest Story Ever Told - 1991
Northern Exposure - 1991
Martial Law II: Undercover (Video) - 1991
Reasonable Doubts (TV Series) - 1991
Matlock - 1992
Silk Stalkings - 1992
Double Jeopardy (TV Movie) - 1992
Return to Frogtown - 1992
Dark Vengeance - 1992
Danger Theatre (TV Series) - 1993
Subspecies 2: Bloodstone (1993)
Subspecies 3: Bloodlust (1994)
Phoenix - 1995
Subspecies 4: Bloodstorm (1998)
The Silencing (Short) - 2000
The Seventh Sense (Short) - 2001
The Monster Man (Video) - 2001
Heart of Stone - 2001
Vampire Resurrection - 2001
CSI:Miami- 2002
L.A. Twister - 2004
Gone But Not Forgotten (TV Movie) - 2005
For Heaven's Sake - 2008
Night of the Living Dead - 2012
Trophy Heads - 2014
Days of Our Lives - 2015, 2018
Codex - 2016

See also 
 Dark Vengeance (1993 film)

References

External links 
Official site

1965 births
Living people
American film actresses
American television actresses
American soap opera actresses
21st-century American women